MyAnimeList, often abbreviated as MAL, is an anime and manga social networking and social cataloging application website run by volunteers. The site provides its users with a list-like system to organize and score anime and manga. It facilitates finding users who share similar tastes and provides a large database on anime and manga. As of 2008, the site claimed to have 4.4 million anime and 775,000 manga entries.  In 2015, the site received 120 million visitors a month.

History
The site was launched in November 2004 by Garrett Gyssler and maintained solely by him until 2008. Originally, the website was called AnimeList, but Gyssler decided to incorporate the possessive "My" at the beginning, following the fashion of the most important social network in those years: Myspace.

On August 4, 2008, CraveOnline, a men's entertainment and lifestyle site owned by AtomicOnline, purchased MyAnimeList for an undisclosed sum of money. In 2015, DeNA announced that it had purchased MyAnimeList from CraveOnline, and that they would partner with Anime Consortium Japan to stream anime on the service, via Daisuki.

MyAnimeList announced in April 2016 that they had embed episodes from Crunchyroll and Hulu directly onto the site, with over 20,000 episodes being made available on the site.

In January 2017, MyAnimeList rewrote an anti-Nazi article written by a contributor on the site to be more pro-Nazi without notice to the contributor.

On March 8, 2018, MyAnimeList opened an online manga store, in partnership with Kodansha Comics and Viz Media, allowing users to purchase manga digitally from the website. The service originally launched in Canada but later expanded to United States, the United Kingdom, and several other English-speaking countries.

MAL became inaccessible for several days in May and June 2018 when site staff took it offline for maintenance, citing security and privacy concerns. The site operators also disabled the API for third-party apps, rendering them unusable. The moves were done in an effort to conform to the European Union's GDPR program.

MyAnimeList was acquired by Media Do in January 2019; with their purchase, they announced their intention to focus on marketing and e-book sales to strengthen the site.

On September 25, 2019, HIDIVE and MyAnimeList announced a partnership which would incorporate MyAnimeList's content ratings into HIDIVE's streaming platform, while exclusively providing MyAnimeList users with a curated selection of embedded HIDIVE content for free.

On February 18, 2021, MyAnimeList announced Kodansha, Shueisha and Shogakukan have started investing in MAL.

In October 2021, MyAnimeList collaborated with e-book publisher Media Do to release Fist of the North Star Manga Fragments: Dying Like a Man, a series of non-fungible token (NFT) products based on the Fist of the North Star manga.

Features
MyAnimeList lists anime (Japanese animation), aeni (Korean animation), and donghua (Chinese animation). Similarly, MyAnimeList has information on manga (Japanese comics), manhwa (Korean comics), manhua (Chinese comics), as well as dōjinshi (fan comics) and light novels. Users create lists that they strive to complete. Users can submit reviews, write recommendations, blogs, post in the site's forum, create clubs to unite with people of similar interests, and subscribe to the RSS news feed of anime and manga related news. MAL also starts challenges for users to complete their 'lists.'

Scoring
MyAnimeList allows users to score the anime and manga on their list on a scale from 1 to 10. These scores are then aggregated to give each show in the database a rank from best to worst. A show's rank is calculated twice a day using the following formula:

Only scores where a user has completed at least 20% of the anime/manga are calculated.

In February 2020, MyAnimeList updated its scoring system to prevent vote brigading.

See also

Otaku
Otaku USA
Anime News Network

References

External links
Official website

Anime and manga fandom
Anime and manga websites
Internet properties established in 2004
Online film databases
Otaku
Social cataloging applications